The 1994 Alaska gubernatorial election took place on November 8, 1994, for the post of Governor of Alaska, United States. Democratic candidate Tony Knowles narrowly defeated Republican candidate Jim Campbell and Lieutenant Governor Jack Coghill of the Alaskan Independence Party.  In the Republican Revolution year of the 1994 elections, Alaska's was the only governor's seat in the country to switch from Republican to Democratic.

Candidates
Incumbent Governor Wally Hickel had been elected as the candidate of the Alaskan Independence Party in the 1990 gubernatorial election. In April 1994 he rejoined the Republican Party and announced in August that he would not stand for re-election.

In the Democratic primary, the Democratic candidate from 1990 and former mayor of Anchorage, Tony Knowles, won with 43% of the vote. He defeated former Lieutenant Governor Stephen McAlpine with 31% and former Speaker of the Alaskan House of Representatives Sam Cotten with 25%. Perennial candidate Don Wright only received 550 votes.

For the Republican nomination, businessman Jim Campbell narrowly defeated another former mayor of Anchorage, Tom Fink. Lieutenant Governor Jack Coghill was easily selected as the candidate for the Alaskan Independence Party while Jim Sykes ran for the Green Party of Alaska.

Ralph Winterrowd, an Anchorage businessman, ran as the candidate of the Patriot Party.

Campaign
Both main candidates in the election were regarded as moderates and favored oil exploration in the Arctic National Wildlife Refuge as well as cuts in the state budget. Polls near the election showed Knowles with a strong lead over Campbell.

During the election the Campbell campaign ran an advertisement comparing Knowles's hair with President Bill Clinton's. The advert was criticised by supporters of Knowles who felt it implied that he was a womanizer.

Polling

Recount
As the results were counted state officials said that the contest between Knowles and Campbell was too close to call, with Knowles having a small lead. Knowles declared victory on the November 18 after the official count showed that he was ahead of 528 votes with only 217 votes remaining to be counted. He described the victory as the "largest margin I think I've ever won by" as his Anchorage mayoralty election wins had always been by very narrow margins.

Campbell contested the results and called for a recount, which was paid for by the state as the candidates were within half a percent of each other. Campbell also wanted to look into some voter incentives that had taken place including raffles and free gasoline for voters. These were defended as attempts to increase turnout and had been authorised by election officials.

The initial count showed Knowles with 87,701 votes and Campbell with 87,118 votes. The results of the recount slightly narrowed the gap between them with Knowles ending on 87,693 and Campbell on 87,157. Knowles's victory margin was the smallest in any Alaska gubernatorial election.

Election results

References

1994
Alaska
Gubernatorial